Cornalba is a comune (municipality) in the Province of Bergamo in the Italian region of Lombardy, located about  northeast of Milan and about  northeast of Bergamo.

The municipality of Cornalba contains the frazione (subdivision) Passoni.

Cornalba borders the following municipalities: Costa di Serina, Gazzaniga, Oltre il Colle, Oneta, Serina, Vertova.

Demographic evolution

Twin towns — sister cities
Cornalba is twinned with:

  Saint-Hilaire-de-Brens, France (1998)

References